Muskrat Creek is a creek that flows into the Seneca River by Weedsport, New York.

References

Rivers of Cayuga County, New York
Rivers of New York (state)